The Bank of Cyprus (BoC) is a Cypriot financial services company established in 1899 with its headquarters in Strovolos.

Current operations 
The Bank of Cyprus currently operates 108 branches or business offices across the Republic of Cyprus. The group also has representative offices in Romania (€33 million net exposure as of 2007), Greece (€309 million exposure as of 2007), Russia (€21 million net exposure as of 2007), Ukraine, and China. It is the largest bank in Cyprus by market penetration, with 83% of Cypriots having active Bank of Cyprus accounts, representing 60% of total corporate accounts and 40% of the overall banking sector.

The shares of the bank are listed on the Cyprus Stock Exchange (CSE). The bank is the largest listed company on the CSE in terms of market capitalization. Since 8 October 2007, it has been part of the Cyprus 10 Index, which comprises the 10 largest companies in Cyprus. It was listed on the Athens Exchange from 2000 to 9 January 2017 and was part of the FTSE/Athex Large Cap index from 9 October 2006 to March 2013. It was also listed on the London Stock Exchange in January 2017.

History 

The Nicosia Savings Bank or Nicosia Depository (Ταμιευτήριο η Λευκωσία) was founded on 1 January 1899 by a group of Cypriots led by Ioannis Economides, a figure in financial and social circles. The bank was the first Cypriot bank, with all the other banks in Cyprus being foreign-owned. In 1912, it became a public company and changed its name to Bank of Cyprus (BoC). In 1930, BoC incorporated as a limited company and in 1943 if merged with Famagusta Bank and Larnaca Bank (est. 1926).

In 1944, BoC acquired the Melissa Bank, Paphos (est. 1924), and the Mortgage Bank of Cyprus was established. In 1945, BoC merged with the Cyprus Savings Bank (Kypriakon Tomieftiron) (est. 1908). In 1953, BoC merged with Paphos Popular Bank (Paphos Laiki Bank) (est. 1924).

In 1955, BoC opened the London branch, its first branch abroad, and in 1960 BoC established a subsidiary, Bank of Cyprus (London) Ltd.: Xeros, Morphou and Zodhia (Nicosia District), Golden Sands, Kato Varosha, Kennedy Avenue, Democratias Avenue, Evagoras Avenue and Oceania (Famagusta Town), Yialousa, Rizokarpaso and Lysi (Famagusta District), and Kyrenia, Karavas and Lapithos branches (Kyrenia District).

In 1982, BoC acquired Standard Chartered Bank's Cypriot operations. (The then Chartered Bank had bought the Ionian Bank's Cypriot operations in 1957.) BoC also opened a representative office in Greece. In 1986, BoC opened a representative office in Australia.
1991 BoC established its first branch in Greece.
1995 BoC opened a representative office in South Africa, and a branch in Heraklion, Crete.
1996 BoC established Bank of Cyprus (Channel Islands) in Guernsey, and a representative office in Toronto, Ontario, Canada, located in the heart of Greektown in Toronto to serve mainly the Greek-Cypriot community.
 A subsidiary company, Cyprus Leasing S.A., was established in Greece to deal with leasing activities. It is now the second largest of its kind in Greece. In Cyprus, leasing activities are carried out by a dedicated department of BoC itself rather than a focused subsidiary.
1998 BoC established representative offices in New York and Moscow.
2000 BoC established a subsidiary in Australia, the country with the world's largest Greek and Cypriot community. BOC had long had a presence in the Australian market through its representative offices in Sydney, Melbourne, Adelaide and Brisbane. BoC also opened a representative office in Bucharest.
BoC bid for Interbank in New York for about $43 million. Interbank was 78% owned by Greek businessman Dimitris Kontominas, and the remaining equity was dispersed among three other shareholders. With four branches in New York, including the Astoria, Queens area where there is a strong Greek presence, the bank catered to the Greek American community. The U.S. Federal Reserve withheld its approval and the bid expired.

2004 BoC merged its UK branch with its subsidiary Bank of Cyprus (London) Ltd. to form "Bank of Cyprus UK".
2005 BoC opened its Pallini branch in eastern Athens, reaching 100 branches in Greece.
2007 On 8 October, BoC opened a branch in Moscow, the first Cypriot bank to have banking operations in Russia. In the same year, two branches were opened in Athens (Haidari and Spata).
2008 BoC purchased 80% of Uniastrum, the 9th largest bank in Russia, for US$576 million. Gagik Zakarian and George Piskov, founders of Uniastrum, retained a 10% stake each as president and chairman, respectively. Uniastrum Bank had over 220 branches throughout Russia and continued to operate under its own name, which however was linked with that of the Bank of Cyprus Group. Just at that time, funds under Uniastrum management went bankrupt. Investors lost US$100 million.
2008 BoC acquired 97% of AvtoZAZBank in Ukraine, which operated through 26 branches and 18 seasonal cash offices located in Ukraine's four main regions. The bank traded under the Bank of Cyprus name.
2010 BoC established a banking unit in the Dubai International Financial Centre (DIFC), in the Emirate of Dubai, in the United Arab Emirates. It also established a representative office in India. In Cyprus, Ayios Lazaros branch in Larnaca closed, due to the forthcoming demolition of the building housing it. Despite the harsh economic downturn in Greece, the network there continued to grow, with the opening of 20 branches throughout Greece, with 10 located in Greater Athens, five in Salonica, and five in other areas. Russian oligarch Dmitriy Rybolovlev (through Odella Resources fund) acquired 9.7%  of BoC.
2011 BoC sold Bank of Cyprus Australia to Bendigo and Adelaide Bank. The former Bank of Cyprus Australia is now known as Delphi Bank.
2012 Bank of Cyprus UK became a subsidiary, regulated by the Financial Services Authority. Under pressure from the Central Bank of Cyprus, CEO Andreas Eliades and Deputy CEO Yiannis Pehlivanides resigned as BoC could not reach by private means the 9% Core Tier 1 capital by 30 June 2012 that the European Banking Authority had required. Eliades's replacement was Yiannis Kypri. Later Chairman Theodoros Aristodemou resigned and was replaced by Andreas Artemi. The bank was also forced to re-consider its strategy of rapid international expansion.
2012–2013 Due to the harsh economic downturn in both Cyprus and Greece, BoC began downsizing its network in Greece by closing branches, with the greater Athens area most affected (closures as at March 2013 were the branches at Omonia Square, Phidippides Street, America Square, Gyzi, Tavros, Petralona, Kessariani, Nea Ionia, Yerakas, Spata, Peania, Drapetsona, Ayios Ierotheos and Keratea). Three branches were closed in Salonica (Nikis Street, Stavros and Ionia), one in Patra (Acrotiriou Street, leaving the Corinth Street and Ayea branches in operation), one in Heraclion, Crete (62 Martyrs Avenue), Asklipiou Street in Trikala, which was merged with the town's other branch at 28 October Street, the Corfu Harbour branch was merged with the Corfu Town branch, Ialyssos branch on the island of Rhodes was absorbed by the Rhodes Town branch, while the towns of Alexandria in northern Greece and Loutraki became devoid of Bank of Cyprus branches altogether. In most cases, the ATMs of the branches were either retained on site or transferred to nearby premises to allow former customers some form of access to their accounts. In addition to downsizing the network, the bank reduced its staff by 300 by way of voluntary redundancy, but aimed to further reduce its number of branches first to 110 from 166, and then closing all of its smaller branches with up to five staff, maintaining only a small number of branches in key locations.
On 26 March 2013 the Greek branches of the bank, along with those of CPB Bank (the Greek arm of the now defunct Laiki Bank) and Hellenic Bank, were sold to Piraeus Bank. Unlike other banks in the Piraeus Bank Group (e.g. Geniki Bank), which retained for a while its corporate identity, the "Bank of Cyprus" brand was replaced in the ex-Bank of Cyprus branches by the Piraeus Bank corporate identity.
On 29 March 2013 the loan business (advances) of Cyprus Popular Bank Public Co Ltd (Laiki UK), pursuant to a legal decree put in place by the Cypriot authorities, was transferred to Bank of Cyprus Public Co Ltd (Bank of Cyprus.) Also the Romanian operations apart from Head Office and some loans were taken over by Marfin Romania.
 In 2013 Cyprus Popular Bank was absorbed into the Bank of Cyprus. On 27 March 2013 the board and CEO were replaced. A Special Administrator was put in place (Dinos Christophides) for 4 months to oversee the merger with the good parts of Cyprus Popular Bank. A new interim board (with Dr Sophocles Michaeilides as Chairman) and interim CEO (Christos Sorotos) were put in place for 3 months, to replace the Special Administrator to lead the bank to an Annual General Meeting on 10 September 2013 and to oversee the "bail in" of depositors and to restructure and downsize the new bank. Staff salaries were cut up to 30% and a voluntary retirement scheme was agreed with the bank workers' union. The branch network in Cyprus was also rationalised, as were the head office functions of the two merged banks. A new CEO John Hourican took the helm with Dr. Christis Hasapis as Chairman.
2015 On the 26 January 2015 The bank authorised Bank of Cyprus UK to administer debt on their behalf for all ex Laiki UK (Cyprus Popular Bank Public Co Ltd) customers. The Russian subsidiary Uniastrum Bank was sold in July 2015. The last remaining Romanian Branch was wound down, with the bank focusing only on its two key markets: Cyprus and the United Kingdom.
2016 The Bank repaid its Emergency Liquidity Assistance and de-listed from the Athens Exchange.
2017  On 19 January the bank was listed on the London Stock Exchange.
2018 In July the bank sold its UK subsidiary for S£103 million to Cynergy Capital Ltd., to focus on its home market. The branches of the bank's former UK subsidiary were rebranded as Cynergy Bank on 3 December 2018.
2019 Chairman Josef Ackermann announced his departure before the May Annual General Meeting and was replaced by Greek banker Takis Arapoglou who was chairman of the Titan Cement and formerly the governor of the National Bank of Greece from 2004 to 2009. CEO John Hourican will also step down in September 2019 and is being replaced by Panicos Nicolaou.

Controversy
In December 2009, Bank of Cyprus' Romanian office announced that it had purchased 9.7% of TLV's (Banca Transilvania) shares for 58 million euros, and in May 2010 expressed interest in acquiring 20% of TLV's stock. DIICOT, the Romanian body that investigates organized crime and terrorism, charged the head of TLV's administration council, Horia Ciorcila, and the head of Bank of Cyprus Romania, Georgios Christofourou, with stock market manipulation and money laundering in this transaction. DIICOT also charged a former vice-president of the administration council or TLV, Claudiu Silaghi, and other individuals. Bank of Cyprus Romania denied any wrongdoing. The Bucharest Tribunal acquitted Ciorcila and Christofourou on 4 July 2011, as did the Bucharest Court of Appeal on 27 June 2012. On 2 July 2014, the Romanian High Court of Justice rejected the second appeal made by DIICOT as ungrounded. Consequently, the acquittal decisions of the Bucharest Tribunal (2011) and Court of Appeal (2012) have been maintained, confirming the full acquittal of all defendants.

In 2014, the bank sold off non-core assets and has thus sold its stake in the Romanian Banca Transilvania and the Ukrainian bank was also sold. After a 1 billion euro increase in capital led by CEO John Hourican, a new board and shareholders took the helm in November 2014 led by Josef Ackermann and Wilbur Ross. Ross represented funds that controlled about 19% of the bank, including Renova Group's affiliate Lamesa Investments Ltd 9.2% stake in 2018 (5.46% in 2014) and TD Asset Management with 5.23% in 2014. Ross brought with him as co-chair Vladimir Strzhalkovsky, who was a former KGB agent and one-time chairman of Norilsk Nickel from August 2008 to December 2012, as well as a long-time close associate of Vladimir Putin; however, Strzhalkovsky was replaced in 2015 with Maksim Goldman, who was a board member of Rusal until 11 April 2018 and directs the Viktor Vekselberg associated Renova Group's strategic projects.

Deposit tax and bailout or bailin

A decision was imposed by EU finance ministers to force depositors in Cyprus to take a loss (bail in), in order to help fund an International Monetary Fund and euro zone bailout (bail-in in the case of Bank of Cyprus: with 47.5% of uninsured depositors, above 100,000 Euro, contributing to the bank's recapitalization).

References

External links

Bank of Cyprus Cultural Foundation Official Website
Bank of Cyprus Oncology Center Official Website

 
Banks established in 1899
Economy of Nicosia District
1899 establishments in Cyprus
Companies formerly listed on the Athens Exchange
Companies listed on the London Stock Exchange
Banks under direct supervision of the European Central Bank